Inquisitor frausseni is a species of sea snail, a marine gastropod mollusc in the family Pseudomelatomidae.

Distribution
This marine species occurs off the Philippines.

References

 Stahlschmidt P., Poppe G.T. & Tagaro S.P. (2018). Descriptions of remarkable new turrid species from the Philippines. Visaya. 5(1): 5-64. page(s): 19, pl. 13 figs 1–3.

External links

frausseni
Gastropods described in 2018